Sherry Argov (born November 5, 1977) is a French-born American author. She is the author of the books Why Men Love Bitches and Why Men Marry Bitches. Both books are New York Times bestsellers.

Sherry's work has been featured on national television shows such as The Today Show, The View and Fox News Channel's "The O'Reilly Factor."

Books
 Why Men Love Bitches: From Doormat to Dreamgirl – A Woman's Guide to Holding Her Own in a Relationship (2002)
 Why Men Marry Bitches: A Woman's Guide to Winning Her Man's Heart (2006)

References

1977 births
American self-help writers
Living people
21st-century American non-fiction writers
21st-century American women writers
American women non-fiction writers